The 2017–18 season was Aston Villa's second consecutive season in the Championship following their relegation from the Premier League during the 2015–16 season. It was also their 143rd year in existence.

John Terry joined the club and was appointed captain. Villa secured a play-off place and defeated Middlesbrough to reach the final, but lost 1–0 to Fulham in the final and thus missed out on promotion to the Premier League.

Competitions

Championship

League table

Results summary

Results by matchday

Matches
On 21 June 2017, the league fixtures were announced.

Play-offs

FA Cup
In the FA Cup, Aston Villa entered the competition in the third round and were drawn at home against either Woking or Peterborough United. The latter won their replayed tie 5–2 to visit Villa Park in the third round.

EFL Cup
On 16 June 2017, the draw for the first round took place with a trip to Colchester United confirmed. Villa were drawn at home to Wigan Athletic in the second round. A third round home time against Middlesbrough was made on 24 August 2017.

Pre-season friendlies

Transfers

Transfers in

Transfers out

Loans in

Loans out

Squad statistics

Appearances and goals
Ref:

|-
! colspan=14 style=background:#dcdcdc; text-align:center| Goalkeepers

|-
! colspan=14 style=background:#dcdcdc; text-align:center| Defenders

|-
! colspan=14 style=background:#dcdcdc; text-align:center| Midfielders

|-
! colspan=14 style=background:#dcdcdc; text-align:center| Forwards

|-
! colspan=14 style=background:#dcdcdc; text-align:center| Players transferred or loaned out during the season

|-

Top scorers
Sources:

Disciplinary record

Suspensions served

References

Aston Villa
Aston Villa F.C. seasons